Bert Rache (died August 1928) born Joseph Bernard Rash, was an Australian composer, music director, conductor, pianist, company leader.

Bert Rache grew up in Lismore, New South Wales, and began his career as a musician in the late 1890s. After touring as George Rignold's orchestra leader, he was employed as a pianist with Harry Rickards in 1903 (continuing this association for many years). His early career also saw him associated with Perth's Palace Gardens (1904–06) and King's Theatre (c. 1909). Rache was in much demand as a music director/composer and arranger throughout the 1910s and 1920s and toured his own troupes at various times, including the Imperial Orchestra and Th' Drolls.

Works
1906 Imperial Intermezzo
1906 Dance of the Rosebuds
1907 Tivoli Mazurka
1908 We of the Southern Cross March
1910 Besses o' the barn march
1911 Take me back to Bendigo
1910 The Rivals Waltz
1912 suite of works for pantomime 'Aladin' including Forty Thieves two step and Sinbad waltz
1912 Silvery Moon Schottische
19212 Surfer's Two Step (arrangement)
1912 Confetti waltz / by Bert Rache
1915 Suite of works for musical play entitled 'Come Over Here'
1916 Suite of works for pantomime 'Puss in Boots'
1907 Daughter of Australia  for a stage production of The Squatter's Daughter (play), later a successful silent global film.
1921 Golden Days
 Buckle Up - One Step novelty
 I've made up my mind to leave my dear old home.
To live in the light od your eyes
I never knew I loved you, till you said goodbye

Americana Faux
Bert Rache published a few fake American songs, presumably to capture audience enthusiasm for imported exotica, or accompaniment of American stage productions.
1913 On the Mississippi
1910 I'm going back to Dixie - two step
1909 Way down on the old Swanee (arrangement)

Recordings
A recording of a topical patriotic song 'Soldier Sentry of the Deep' is in circulation, celebrating the triumphant return of HMS New Zealand from the great war.

A gramophone recording exists of patriotic march 'They Were There (There, There)' with lyrics by War Hero Harley Cohen vocals by Foster Richardson, thirteenth item

References

1928 deaths
Year of birth missing
Australian composers